Qasemabad (also Romanized as Qāsemābād and Qāsimābād) is a village in Asgariyeh Rural District, in the Central District of Pishva County, Tehran Province, Iran. At the 2006 census, its population was 818, in 170 families.

References 

Populated places in Pishva County